was a Japanese film director. He was a director of Toei film company and he often worked with Ken Takakura in such films as Eki and Shin Abashiri Bangaichi. He won the 2000 Japan Academy Prize for Director of the Year and 31st International Film Festival of India for Poppoya. He died 20 May 2019.

Filmography
 Hikō Shōjo Yōko (1966)
 Boss in a Jail (1968)
 Gendai Yakuza: Yotamono Jingi (1969)
 Rise and Fall of Yakuza (1970)
 Winter's Flower (1978)
 Nihon no Fixer (1979)
 Eki (1981)
 Shikake-nin Baian (1981)
 Izakaya Chōji (1983)
 Yasha (1985)
 Shogun's Shadow (1989)
 Buddies (1989)
 Tasmania Monogatari (1990)
 Kura (1995)
 Poppoya (1999)
 The Firefly (2001)
 Akai Tsuki (2004)
 Riding Alone for Thousands of Miles (2005)
 Anata e (2012)
 A Boy Called H (2013)
 Reminiscences (2017)

References

External links
 
 Yasuo Furuhata's JMDb Listing (in Japanese)

1934 births
2019 deaths
Japan Academy Prize for Director of the Year winners
Japanese film directors
Samurai film directors
Yakuza film directors
People from Matsumoto, Nagano